Kumbia (pronounced "come-bia") is a rural town and locality in the South Burnett Region, Queensland, Australia. In the  the locality of Kumbia had a population of 294 people.

Geography

History
The name Kumbia is from the Waka language but its meaning is uncertain, possibly referring to white ant nests or a small scrub vine.
Kumbia Post Office opened on 19 July 1915 (a receiving office had been open from 1913).

The Kumbia State School opened on 2 February 1914 and celebrated its 100-year anniversary in 2014.

As a memorial for World War I, a memorial school of arts hall was established in 1922.

St Paul's Anglican Church was dedicated on 28 November 1970 by the Right Reverend Wilfrid John Hudson. Its closure circa 2015 was approved by Bishop Cameron Venables.

At the 2011 census, Kumbia had a population of 352 people.

In the  the locality of Kumbia had a population of 294 people.

Education
Kumbia State School is a government primary (Prep-6) school for boys and girls at Bell Street. In 2018, the school had an enrolment of 62 students with 7 teachers (5 full-time equivalent) and 9 non-teaching staff (4 full-time equivalent).

There is no secondary school in Kumbia. The nearest secondary school is Kingaroy State High School in Kingaroy to the north-east.

Amenities
Kumbia has many small street-front shops including a Fuel Station with post office, store and caravan park, a mechanic, a general store, a butcher's shop and a pub.

Vodafone will serve the town and surrounding area with mobile phone service as part of the National Blackspot Program from Q3 2016.

The Kumbia branch of the Queensland Country Women's Association meets at the QCWA Hall at 38 Bell Street.

Notable residents
 Warren Truss, Deputy Prime Minister of Australia, used to live in Kumbia

References

External links 

 

Towns in Queensland
South Burnett Region
Localities in Queensland